Vazmak (also known as Vīzmak) is a village in Qaleh Juq Rural District, Anguran District, Mahneshan County, Zanjan Province, Iran. At the 2006 census, its population was 201, in 42 families.

References 

Populated places in Mahneshan County